The Nuneaton rail crash occurred on 6 June 1975, on the West Coast Main Line just south of Nuneaton railway station in Warwickshire, England, United Kingdom.

The crash happened when the 23:30 sleeper from London Euston to Glasgow derailed after entering a temporary speed restriction at too high a speed. Six people (four passengers and two staff) died and 38 were injured. In the subsequent inquiry, the accident was deemed to have been caused by driver error, partially due to the failure of lineside equipment warning of the speed restriction.

The accident
The accident occurred at approximately 01:54, as the British Rail passenger train approached Nuneaton station. The train, which was running over an hour late because of a locomotive failure further south, was composed of two Class 86 electric locomotives (nos. 86006 and 86242; both later repaired) and fifteen carriages, including twelve Mark 1 sleeping cars, two Brake Gangwayed and a Restaurant miniature buffet. Among the passengers was Minister for Agriculture Fred Peart, who would survive the crash with minor injuries.

The warning board was placed at the standard 'service braking distance' of a mile and a quarter before the restriction. This board should have been illuminated, but was not. The driver, John McKay, claimed that he assumed this meant the restriction had been lifted and did not need to slow the train. It was not until he saw the correctly illuminated 'commencement board' at the start of the restriction that he realized it was still in place, but by then it was too late.

Despite an emergency brake application, the train entered the 20 mph restriction at an estimated  and derailed on a sharply curved length of temporary track being used during the remodelling scheme. The locomotives became detached from one another; the first continued in a straight line and came to a stop halfway through the station between the platforms, but the second veered sideways, striking and then mounting the northbound platform, coming to a rest after colliding with the platform canopy. The coaches behind them derailed and zig-zagged across the tracks causing severe damage to the track and lineside structures. The first two coaches stayed mainly upright, but the next four fell on their sides, badly crushing the third, fourth and fifth coaches. All the fatalities and most of the injuries occurred in these four sleeping cars. Every vehicle on the train was derailed except the last. The inquiry noted that casualties would have been much higher if not for the lightly loaded nature of the train (there were fewer than 100 passengers on board). 

Over  of track was destroyed along with three lineside electrification gantries, as well as severe damage to an overhead road bridge, numerous items of trackside equipment, and the locomotive of a passing freight train (Class 25 number 25286), which was damaged by falling overhead line equipment.

The Inquiry

The inquiry, conducted by Major C.F. Rose, found the accident to be due to the following causes:
 The advance warning board was not illuminated because the gas lighting equipment had been set up incorrectly, and had gone out some time between 01:10 and 01:40. The lights had gone out because the gas cylinder supplying it had run empty; the equipment had two gas cylinders, and included a valve which would allow the gas supply to automatically switch from one cylinder to the other when one was empty, but this valve was not being used.
 A number of drivers on preceding trains noticed that the lights had gone out, but did not stop and report it as they should have done according to the rules.
 Although he claimed otherwise, it was thought likely that McKay, in his haste to make up lost time, forgot about the speed restriction without the reminder of the warning board.

McKay was later charged with manslaughter but found not guilty after a trial the following year.  

A number of recommendations to prevent a recurrence of the accident were accepted by the British Railways Board, the main one being the installation of temporary Automatic Warning System magnets at speed restriction locations to ensure that drivers were given audible notice of speed restrictions.

Memorial
A plaque commemorating the victims of the crash, as well as the actions of emergency services personnel, was unveiled at Nuneaton station in August 2015.

References

External links

Nuneaton Rail Crash - nuneatonhistory.com - Archive photographs.
A short film recording the aftermath of the tragic train crash that occurred at 1.55am on 6 June 1975.

Railway accidents and incidents in Warwickshire
History of Warwickshire
Railway accidents in 1975
1975 in England
Nuneaton
20th century in Warwickshire
Derailments in England
Accidents and incidents involving British Rail
June 1975 events in the United Kingdom
1975 disasters in the United Kingdom
Rail accidents caused by a driver's error